Basic Glitches is the sixth studio album by the pop punk band Eleventyseven. It was independently released on January 17, 2020. The release was fan-funded through a Kickstarter campaign.

Singles
On November 15, 2019, Eleventyseven released the lead single "Killing My Vibe" to pledgers and later publicly on November 29, 2019.

Track listing

Personnel
Eleventyseven
Matt Langston – lead vocals, synths/programming, producer, engineering, mixing
Additional production
Jeremy Griffith – executive producer
Troy Glessner - mastering
Kent Hernández – album design/layout

B-Sides EP

On November 18, 2019, during the Kickstarter campaign for the release of Basic Gltiches, the band announced that the project had met its first stretch goal after reaching their initial main funding objective.  The first of said goals was the release of a free companion B-Sides EP that would contain cut tracks and acoustic versions of tracks from the album.

On September 25, 2020, Eleventyseven's debuted the lead single from the EP entitled "Hellmouth" featuring North Carolina-based hip-hop artist Spaceman Jones while also announcing the EP's name as Betamosh.  The single was followed later by the full release on November 6, 2020.

On October 30, 2020, the music video for "Hellmouth" debuted on the band's YouTube channel.

Notes
 The album received a track-by-track commentary on the band's podcast.
According to lead singer Matt Langston, the track "Birthrite" is specifically directed towards the criticism surrounding the band's change in direction via the release of their reunion record of Rad Science.
Loaded with pop and geek culture references, the track "Battlecats" cites Fight Club, Harry Potter, The Jungle Book, The Mighty Ducks, Super Street Fighter II Turbo, The Incredible Hulk, Garth Brooks, and REO Speedwagon.
The title of the track "Natsunoyo" is Japanese and translates to "summer night" in English.
On October 11, 2019, Eleventyseven released their cover "Teenage Dirtbag" as a single, prior to the album's release.  The same day of the release, Matt Langston released an interview he performed with Wheatus lead singer Brendan Brown and debuted the track on the band's Eleventylife podcast.

References

2020 albums
Eleventyseven albums